MVAL may refer to:
Mount Vernon Arts Lab, pseudonym of Scottish musician Drew Mulholland
Mission Valley Athletic League, a California schools athletic league
Monocacy Valley Athletic League, a Maryland schools athletic league